is a cyberpunk manga written and illustrated by Masamune Shirow. It was first published as a dōjinshi in 1983, and was later reprinted in tankōbon format by Seishinsha in 1985. The series was later adapted into an OVA  in 1987 which was directed by Hiroyuki Kitakubo. AIC and Animate provided the animation/production while Bandai Visual was chosen as the distributor. The OVA is very loosely based on one of the chapters of the manga and centers around the efforts of a female journalist named Sybel, trying to save a young girl from an out-of-control military android created by the girl's grandfather.

Plot

OVA
A military transport chopper is flying to an undisclosed location with secret cargo – two fully equipped, but un-programmed M-66 battle androids. It becomes apparent that the chopper is suffering from some sort of attack, as one of the turbines flares up before exploding. Both men evacuate the doomed craft and it crashes in a remote forest miles away from Center City, and both of the M-66's storage pods are thrown from the wreckage. The pods open as the M-66s automatically begin their mission. Sybel, a freelance journalist, receives an intercepted Military Broadband Transmission and loads up her equipment to go see what type of footage she can get of the event to sell to the major networks. She's joined by Leakey, her cameraman. Rushing to the scene of the accident, the two of them abandon their truck and try to sneak closer to the crash site, which has already been sealed and cordoned off by the military's retrieval teams.

The military's Special Ops Forces are directed by a professional soldier who is identified only as the 'Major', his status rank. Among the retrieval team is the assistant professor of the android's main design programmer. The M-66s are active searching out their target as well, this becomes apparent when the lead designer, Professor Matthews arrives at the site and talks to Professor Slade, his assistant. It seems that Slade loaded a 'dummy' program into the M-66s before they were transported, which mimics an actual mission engagement. Professor Matthews tells the Major that the SpecOps Forces must find and rescue his granddaughter Ferris, as she is the target the M-66s have been tasked with killing. The Major decides that the best course of action is to confront the androids on their way into the city area, and he sets a trap for both of the cunning machines.

Sybel and Leakey, meanwhile – had been captured by the SpecOps Forces in the forest, their equipment was taken, and they were arrested. Both were to be administered a shot of sodium pentothal – but only Leakey is given the shot- the android's arrival at the soldier's temporary base allows Sybel enough time to try to knock out the guard, but she is ineffective and he shouts at her to quit resisting. Another soldier walks over to their vehicle with a machine gun, and the guard shouts at him to watch Sybel and Leakey, before jumping out to run and join in the battle. Actually mortally wounded, the soldier falls forward and dies, and Sybel takes advantage of the situation to get herself and Leakey out of there. Despite the Major's best advances and planning, the androids engage his men and kill the majority of them, before his soldiers deploy a magnetic device which shuts down the androids for a limited time. Using the device, the soldiers manage to pin one of the M-66s on the hood of a transport vehicles and restrain it using nets. However just before they can retrieve the android, it self-destructs, which propels 20,000 small bore projectiles embedded within its skin in every direction. The Major's surviving forces turn their attention to the remaining M-66, which easily beats them back and then makes its own escape by jumping into the air and disappearing into the surrounding forest. Beaten, but not one to give up easily, the Major regroups his forces and calls for a transport craft to pick them up.

Sybel and Leakey make it back to their truck, and Sybel drops Leakey off with the film to go sell to the networks while she tries to get more information on what has happened. By accident, she discovers Professor Matthew's house deep in the forest. It has been ransacked by the surviving M-66. She then listens as a voicemail message begins playback. It is Professor Matthew's granddaughter Ferris saying that she will be home late and that she is out with friends at a restaurant in the city. Sybel realizes that the M-66 must have heard this same message and has gone to kill Ferris. In her haste, Sybel arrives at the restaurant and finds Ferris, who is reluctant to follow her. Sybel has to tell Ferris that the M-66 is there to kill her, and from then on, it's a fight to stay alive for both Sybel and Ferris- with help from the Major and his SpecOps Forces running defense against the unstoppable android.

Sybel and Ferris make their way up the skyscraper, pursued by the android as it dispatches the soldiers attempting to escort the pair. As they reach the roof, a fight between the M-66 and a gunship results in the top several floors of the building starting to collapse. As the android closes in, Sybel sets off explosive charges, propelling the M-66 off the tower. Sybel and Ferris are rescued by the military, and the remains of the M-66 are recovered. The Major decides not to arrest Sybel out of gratitude for her assistance, but does confiscate her equipment. Sybel returns home and turns on the news, where it's revealed the incident has been passed off as a terrorist attack. Leaky appears on the news, having sold the footage and taken full credit for it, only to realize too late it includes video of him passed out in the truck. During the credits, scenes play out of Sybel filming various stories, before cutting to a lab where the now-inactive M-66 is placed back into a pod.

OVA credits 

Additional voices:

 English: Dan Woren (as Jackson Daniels), Gloria Gines, Hank Crowell Jr. (as Sonny Byrkett), Jan Rabson (as Stanley Gurd Jr.) Joe Romersa, Julie Maddalena (as Julie Kliewer), Kevin Seymour (as Dougary Grant), Kirk Thornton (as Spanky Roberts), Les Claypool III, Michael Sorich, Steve Bulen (as Stevie Beeline), Tom Fahn (as Tom Charles), Tom Konkle (as Arnie Hanks), Tony Pope (as Anthony Mozdy), Yiu Lee

Release

Manga
Black Magic was first released by Atlas magazine in 1983 and then reprinted in 1984. The story was republished by Seishinsha in 1985. An English translation of Black Magic was released in four parts by Eclipse Comics in 1990. An English language trade paperback version of the story was released by Dark Horse Comics in 1998 and reprinted in 2008.

OVA
An English subtitled version of the OVA was released in VHS format in 1991 by U.S. Renditions. An English dubbed version of the OVA was released in VHS format by Manga Entertainment 1995, and later in DVD format in 2001. An English subtitled version in DVD and digital distribution formats was released in 2013 by Maiden Japan.

Reception
Greg Hackmann's review of Black Magic for The Fandom post compliments the manga's artwork but criticizes the narrative, and concludes that the story doesn't have much appeal outside of being Masamune Shirow's first work.

In his 2013 review Theron Martin from Anime News Network said that the series had a "dated look" to it. Martin also praised the character designs though along with the android action giving the overall subtitled OVA a B− grade. Carlos Ross from THEM Anime reviews gave the OVA a 3/5 star rating calling it "not a bad effort by any means". In his review Ross compared the villains in Black Magic to those in Terminator 2: Judgment Day for their lack of humanity which adds to their terrifying nature. He goes on to recommend the OVA for an audience that likes graphic violence.

References

External links
The Anime Critic (Review to be added to the reception section)
Black Magic M-66 at the Internet Movie Database

1983 manga
1987 anime OVAs
Cyberpunk anime and manga
Dark Horse Comics titles
Masamune Shirow
Maiden Japan